Roswell is an American science fiction television series developed, produced, and co-written by Jason Katims. The series debuted on October 6, 1999, on the WB and later shifted to UPN for the third season. The final episode aired on May 14, 2002. Sixty-one episodes in total were broadcast over the show's three seasons. In the United Kingdom, the show aired as both Roswell High and Roswell.

The series is based on the Roswell High young adult book series, written by Melinda Metz and edited by Laura J. Burns, who later became staff writers for the television series.

A reimagining of the series, titled Roswell, New Mexico was ordered to series on May 11, 2018, and premiered on January 15, 2019, on The CW.

Cast

Main 
 Shiri Appleby as Liz Parker: A teenage girl who learns the aliens' secret after Max saves her life. The two develop a relationship afterward.
 Jason Behr as Max Evans:  Leader of the Royal Four with the power to heal. Throughout the series, Max struggles with his relationship with Liz, his mysterious alien past, and finding his place as a leader.
 Brendan Fehr as Michael Guerin:  Max's best friend. Michael is an alien who struggles to find his place on earth.  He has a relationship with Maria.  His special power is never revealed and he has the most trouble controlling himself, especially when his emotions are strong.
 Katherine Heigl as Isabel Evans:  Max's sister who struggles to fit in carrying the secret of her alien existence. Isabel has the power to "dream-walk", or enter people's minds during their dreams or her own.
 Majandra Delfino as Maria DeLuca: Liz's best friend who is in on the secret. She is in a relationship with Michael and struggles with it.
 Colin Hanks as Alex Whitman: Liz and Maria's best friend who helps them on their adventures and has a crush on Isabel
 Nick Wechsler as Kyle Valenti:  Jim's son who has suspicions about Max, but eventually becomes a friend
 William Sadler as Sheriff Jim Valenti:  The town sheriff who starts out as an enemy but becomes a powerful ally 
 Emilie de Ravin as Tess Harding: The "fourth" alien who was raised by Nasedo.  Tess has the power to "mind-warp," or cause people to see things that are not really happening.
  Adam Rodriguez as Jesse Ramirez

Recurring
 Garrett M. Brown as Philip Evans:  Max and Isabel's adoptive father 
 Mary Ellen Trainor as Diane Evans: Max and Isabel's adoptive mother
 Diane Farr as Amy DeLuca:  Maria's single mother
 John Doe as Jeff Parker: Liz's father and owner of the Crashdown Cafe
 Jo Anderson as Nancy Parker: Liz's mother
 Nicholas Stratton as Young Michael (season 1): Appears in several flashback sequences 
 Julie Benz as Kathleen Topolsky (season 1):  FBI agent posing as a high school guidance counselor 
 Jim Ortlieb as Nasedo (seasons 1–2):  Alien sent from Antar to watch over the Royal Four.  He has the ability to shapeshift.
 Michael Horse as Deputy Owen Blackwood: Sheriff Jim Valenti's assistant
 Steve Hytner as Milton Ross (season 1): Owner of the UFO center
 Richard Schiff as Agent John Stevens (season 1): FBI agent from the special unit assigned to discover if aliens exist
 David Conrad as Deputy David "Dave" Fisher/FBI Agent Daniel Pierce (seasons 1–2): Head of the FBI special unit assigned to discover if aliens exist
 Devon Gummersall as Sean DeLuca (season 2): Maria's delinquent cousin who has feelings for Liz
 Desmond Askew as Brody Davis/Larek (season 2): New owner of the UFO center who has a young daughter and passion for researching aliens
 Gretchen Egolf as Congresswoman Vanessa Whitaker (season 2): Congresswoman for whom Liz is an assistant before her identity as a skin is discovered  
 Sara Downing as Courtney Banks (season 2): "Skin" who works at the Cafe and thinks Michael should be the leader of the Royal Four
 Miko Hughes as Nicholas Crawford (season 2): Powerful "Skin" who has the appearance of a teenage boy

Guest stars
 Daniel Hansen as Young Max (season 1)
 Sebastian Siegel as Brad
 Carroll Baker as Grandma Claudia (season 1)
 John Cullum as James Valenti Sr. (season 1)
 Jonathan Frakes as Himself (seasons 1 and 3)
 Genie Francis as Queen Mother of Antar (season 1)
 Erica Gimpel as Agent Susan Duff
 Ned Romero as River Dog, old native American man (season 1)
 Howie Dorough as Alien (season 1)
 Nelly Furtado as Herself (season 2)
 Jason Dohring as Jerry (season 2)
 Spence Decker as Kivar (season 3)
Morgan Fairchild as Meris Wheeler (season 3)
 Joe Pantoliano as Kal Langley (season 3)
 John Billingsley as Himself (season 3)

Episodes

Production
Roswell High was originally developed by 20th Century Fox Television and Regency Television for the Fox Network, though it eventually landed on The WB (retitled simply to Roswell) thanks to the latter network's offer to extend a full 22-episode upfront commitment. The pilot episode was filmed in 12 days with a budget of $2,000,000. "The Morning After," the second episode of the series, was the first episode with the full title sequence utilizing the theme song, "Here With Me" by Dido.

Filming locations
 
Roswell was filmed in various locations around California. City Hall, Charter Oak High School, and several other businesses and residences in Covina served as locations for the fictional locations in Roswell, New Mexico, as well as Vasquez Rocks,   park in Los Angeles County. Episode 1 of season 3 was filmed partially in Salina, Utah.

Airing history
The series premiered on October 6, 1999, on The WB in the United States to generally favorable reviews, and it quickly gained an outspoken fanbase.

In response to the problems, the series had with ratings during its first season, the relationship-driven stand-alone episodes of the early first season were to be replaced with more science fiction themes and multi-episode plot arcs. Starting with the second season, after a fierce fan-driven campaign involving bottles of Tabasco sauce—a favorite condiment of the show's alien characters—being sent to the network's offices, veteran science fiction writer Ronald D. Moore was brought in to join Katims as an executive producer and showrunner and to further develop the science fiction elements of the show.

Not all fans responded favorably to the shift to more science fiction-driven storylines during the second season and the ratings continued to disappoint, causing the network to finally cancel the show on May 15, 2001, after the show's second-season finale, a move widely anticipated due to the sagging ratings. 20th Century Fox (the studio that produced the show) was able to persuade UPN to pick it up for a third season as a package deal when UPN outbid The WB for one of its popular flagship series, Buffy the Vampire Slayer. During the 2001 – 2002 television season, Roswell, in its third season, aired directly after Buffy on Tuesday nights on UPN, though it was unable to hold on to the audience Buffy provided as a lead-in. This eventually resulted in the show's cancellation from UPN as well.

Ratings

Plot

Season one
In 1999, Liz Parker, Maria DeLuca, and Alex Whitman are high school students and best friends residing in the small town of Roswell, New Mexico, site of the famed Roswell Incident. Liz Parker's parents own the Crashdown Café, which serves alien-themed dishes. At the beginning of the pilot episode, Liz is waitressing in her parents' restaurant when a disagreement between two customers breaks out. A gun is fired, and Liz is shot. We are introduced to a character named Max Evans, a seemingly normal high school student, who rushes to Liz's aid and saves her life by healing the gunshot wound with his alien abilities. The healing leaves a silver hand print on her stomach. To hide what he has done, Max pours ketchup on Liz before fleeing the scene with his friend Michael Guerin. The shooting acts as a catalyst for the rest of the series action.

Liz is presented as an insatiably curious character, obtaining a sample of Max's saliva, analyzing it, and finding that his cells do not look like normal human cells. When she confronts him, Max admits that he, his sister Isabel and their friend Michael, are aliens whose spaceship crashed at Roswell in 1947. In a dialogue between other characters, we learn that Max, Isabel, and Michael had a pattern of isolating themselves from other students. A love triangle begins between Max, Liz, and Kyle Valenti (the sheriff's son whom Liz was dating).

Though sworn to tell no one, Liz does divulge Max's secret to Maria in the pilot. Eventually, Alex also learns about the aliens. Secrecy and the tension that surrounds secrets become major themes of the series, important to character development, relationships, and plot. Fear of authority is another theme of the series, and the teenagers must protect the secret from antagonists who are in positions of authority: Roswell's sheriff, Jim Valenti, and a series of FBI agents.

Two romances develop between human and alien characters. Liz and Max's romance is portrayed as tender and sweet, while Michael and Maria's is portrayed as passionate and often explosive. Later in the first season a tentative romance develops between Isabel and Alex.

Toward the end of the season another alien character is introduced. Nasedo is a shape shifter, with a violent, murderous past. The gang initially believes that Tess Harding, the new kid in town, is Nasedo because she seems to have a strange effect on Max, but this character turns out to be a teenage alien raised by Nasedo.

At the end of the season, it is revealed that Max, Isabel, Michael and Tess are clones of the "Royal Four" of Antar, the planet these characters come from. In a former life, Max was the king of his planet, Isabel his sister and a princess, Michael his second in command and Tess his wife and the queen. The four learn they are alien-human hybrids: their alien DNA was mixed with human DNA in order to allow them to look like humans and survive on earth. Their mission is to one day return to Antar and reclaim the throne from Kivar, Max's enemy in his previous life. As a result of this revelation, Liz distances herself from Max because she believes she can't get in the way of Max's destiny.

Season two
The second part of Max and Liz's love story involves Liz's insecurities about getting in the way of the destined love between Max and Tess, even though Max assures her his heart only beats for her. This causes a rift between Tess and the rest of the gang, as she always feels unwanted. Right when Liz finally starts to believe Max will deny his destiny of being with Tess, a version of Max from the future (through time travel) called "Future Max" appears to Liz claiming they must find a way to get Max to fall out of love with Liz in order to save the future and the lives of everyone they know. This leads to a relationship between Max and Tess. Despite this, Liz maintains hope she and Max will one day be together.

The second season introduces the Skins, another alien race from Antar who have been searching for the alien hybrids since they hatched. Their mission is to locate and turn them over to Kivar, who is now king of Antar. It is revealed that Liz's new boss, Congresswoman Whitaker, is a Skin and her brother Nicholas is the leader of the Skins. Along with renegade Skin Courtney, a Crashdown Café waitress, who believes Michael, not Max, should have been in charge of Antar, the group travels to the town where Congresswoman Whitaker is from and discovers the entire town is inhabited by Skins and that the Skins are ready for the "Harvest". Skins unlike "The Royal Four" do not contain a mix of alien and human DNA. In order to survive Earth's climate they create husks (fake bodies) which last around 50 years. Skins are so called because once their husks start to reach the end of their shelf lives, they shed their skin.

Nasedo, the shape shifter who was protecting the teen aliens as well as acting as a father to Tess, is killed by Congresswoman Whitaker at the beginning of the season. As Tess has nowhere to go, she moves in with Sheriff Valenti and his son Kyle. Shortly after, the "pod squad" destroys the Harvest. It is revealed during the "Harvest" that Isabel was named Vilandra on Antar. Vilandra was in love with Kivar, Max's enemy and rival, and betrayed her family in favor of Kivar. This haunts Isabel so much it creates a rift between her and Max when they find out another set of clones of the Royal Four were created. The clones, known as the "dupes", are exact copies of Michael, Max, Isabel and Tess, only they grew up in the sewers of New York City. Their names are Rath (Michael's clone), Zan (Max's clone), Lonnie (Isabel's clone), and Ava (Tess's clone).

Rath, Lonnie, and Ava come to Roswell after killing Zan to convince Max to return with them and represent the family at a summit meeting of the families of the five warring planets. Max and Tess go with Rath and Lonnie to New York, while Ava stays in Roswell because she is haunted by the death of her beloved Zan. Nicholas returns as a voice for Kivar, and it is revealed the owner of the UFO museum, Brody Davis, was used by an alien many times to communicate on Earth, acting as a puppet, explaining why he believes he was abducted by aliens although he has no memories of the incident. Rath and Lonnie tell Tess and Max if they give Kivar the Granilith (the rock which came with the "pod squad" when they landed on Earth), they can go home to Antar. Max remembers what Liz told him before he left — "the Granilith could be dangerous if in the wrong hands" — and turns down Kivar's deal. Lonnie betrays the others when she meets with Nicholas in secret to discuss her desire to return to Antar, as she remembers more about her past life and wants it back, regardless of whether Kivar gets the Granilith. Nicholas tells her that can be arranged as long as Max is dead. The assassination attempt fails, and Rath and Lonnie "disappear". Ava, still in Roswell, goes to live a "normal" life and is also not mentioned again; however, she does reveal to Liz that since Max healed her and brought her back, she has "changed" and will be different from now on.

For part of the second season, Alex is on a trip to Sweden. However, shortly after coming back and getting Isabel to see him as something more than a friend and start to love him, he dies tragically in a car accident. Liz is devastated when she discovers the police have evidence to rule Alex's death a suicide. Investigating the wreck, she finds a torn photo of Alex, causing her to suspect that he was murdered. When Liz voices the possibility that an alien killed Alex, she causes tension between the aliens and the humans in the group. Through her investigation, she discovers Alex was never in Sweden, but had actually been living at a Las Cruces college. Liz, Maria, and Michael find out Alex had been working on the translation of the Destiny book. Even though they find the translation, they are unable to discover the identity of Alex's killer.

As Max is angry toward Liz and her investigations. He grows closer to Tess, and they end up sleeping together. Tess discovers that she is pregnant and informs Max that alien pregnancies last about a month. The baby can't survive on Earth, so the aliens make a collective decision to leave the planet, with the knowledge gleaned from the Destiny translation. Everyone has 24 hours to say their goodbyes. Max and Liz make a last-ditch effort to find Alex's killer. Isabel dances with Alex's spirit at his grave. Michael and Maria make love for the first time. Just before the aliens are to leave, Maria and Liz realize that Tess mind-warped Kyle, who is able to recall Alex's death. Michael decides at the last minute that he'd rather stay on Earth with Maria and exits the Granilith. Liz rushes in to tell Max that Tess was the one who killed Alex. Tess reveals that she mindwarped Alex to translate the book. Nasedo made a deal with Kivar: Tess can return home safely as long as she's carrying Max's child, but she must turn over Max, Isabel, and Michael to Kivar. Max lets Tess go and the gang watches as Tess leaves Earth via the Granilith. Maria realizes Michael stayed for her. Max tells Liz he loves her and now must save his son.

Season three
The third and final season opens with Max's quest to save his son. He and Liz are arrested in Utah after holding up a convenience store. They both end up getting out of jail, but their actions have serious consequences for the rest of the season. Liz's father, who disapproves of the relationship throughout the series, threatens to send Liz to a boarding school in an attempt to split the couple up. Max, during the holdup, found an alien ship being stored in the basement, but when he goes back, the ship is gone. While they are in a Utah jail, Michael searches for evidence of a diamond (the key to the space ship) that Max tossed in a field while being chased. A man approaches Michael and warns him and the others to stop their search. This man is mysteriously murdered in L.A. by a fifth alien. Knowing the alien is a shape shifter and in the film industry, Max tries out acting and auditions for a role in Star Trek: Enterprise. The fifth alien is, in fact, a very successful film producer who is also Max's protector. Max, against the fifth alien's wishes, forces him to help find the ship, which is at a military base. They attempt to fly it, but the ship is too damaged from the crash in 1947. Max leaves L.A. disappointed, and he feels as though he has let down his son.

Isabel is revealed to be haunted by Alex's ghost, but it is actually a figure of her subconscious. She begins a relationship with Jesse Ramirez, an attorney several years older than her and who works with Isabel's father. As the season unfolds, Max and Isabel's father is diving deeper into the past of his children, due to Max not giving him a satisfactory reason as to what happened in Utah, or why Max was even there in the first place. Midway through the season, Isabel gets married, much to the disappointment of her parents, Max, and Michael. While on her honeymoon with Jesse, Isabel comes in contact with Kivar. He awakens Isabel's past self, Vilandra, who betrayed Max and Michael in their previous life for her love with Kivar, which is the reason the four of them died in their first life. Kivar tries to compel Isabel (now reawakened as Vilandra) to travel through a portal back to their home world, while Max and Michael attempt to stop them. In the end, Isabel pushes Kivar into the portal.

Michael and Maria are having trouble with their relationship, especially when Maria feels the whole "alien thing" is ruining her life and decides to take a break from the gang so she can try to live out a "normal" life. Michael takes a job as a security guard during the night at a local pharmaceutical factory. But little does Michael know, the owner of the company has been going through the trash to obtain Michael's DNA. When the owners find out he is an alien, they kill one of Michael's co-workers "Munk" to see if Michael is "the healer". But of course Max is the healer, not Michael, so he is powerless to save his dying colleague. Michael and Former Sheriff Valenti find a room with all of Michael's things and realize what the company has discovered; Valenti, however, is captured. Michael enlists the help of Max and Isabel in order to rescue Valenti. During the escape attempt Valenti is shot near the heart from behind. As Max is saving Valenti's life he is taken by the millionaire's desperate wife and goons and coerced into healing the dying millionaire. Max is wary of doing so, as the millionaire has lived out his life and will die of natural causes, but he tries anyway. Max ends up transferring his youth, and the millionaire's body transforms into Max's body, killing Max. While Michael and Isabel try to come to grips with Max's death, a patrol of guards come. Michael and Isabel use their powers to destroy their vehicles, but Isabel is shot. Jesse sees the shooting and panics, insisting that they call an ambulance. Michael is forced to admit to Jesse that he and Isabel are aliens to keep Jesse from calling the authorities. Michael unknowingly inherited Max's powers after his death, and then he heals Isabel during an emotional moment. The millionaire is at his house in Max's body when he receives a memory of Liz. He can't stop thinking about her due to having Max's soul inside him, so he decides he must kill Liz in order to get rid of Max. He travels to Vermont with his reluctant wife to find Liz. He murders his wife and then sets his sights on Liz. As he is about to kill Liz, they both fall from the "Rat" (Rathskeller) attic window of Liz's boarding school. Seeing Liz is about to die, Max takes control over the body and uses his powers to save her life while he hits the ground. The millionaire's soul dies, and Max miraculously survives after Liz kisses him. The group heads back to Roswell.

Meanwhile, the FBI has been studying the group for many months and is closing in on them. Liz begins to exhibit alien powers, including premonitions, toward the end of the season, which later causes her to become a target. When Tess returns with Max's son, Zan, the gang must group together and plan to escape Roswell. Tess' unexpected arrival causes the FBI to find more evidence of the aliens, including a video revealing Isabel's powers. Everyone is angry with Tess and at first tries to kill her, but instead end up helping her. Because of Liz's forgiveness, Tess decides to sacrifice herself by turning herself in and blowing up the military base. The baby is revealed to be fully human, as only Max's and Tess' human DNA produced the baby. Max, realizing his son can have a normal life, gives him up for adoption; showing the Evans' parents driving the child away to New York.

The series closes with Liz getting a premonition of her, Max, Michael, and Isabel dying in an FBI setup, so they decide to leave Roswell after their high school graduation. With the realization he will be leaving Roswell, possibly forever, Michael professes his love for Maria and she makes the decision to be with him no matter what. After Liz, Max, Michael, Isabel, Maria, and Kyle escape from their high school graduation, where the FBI setup is, they hit the road in a van, where there are several emotional goodbyes, especially between Kyle and his father, Jim Valenti. Isabel decides to leave her husband behind in order to save his life. The final scenes of the show feature Max and Liz getting married and Liz's father reading her journal, chronicling the last three years. The series closes with Liz climbing into the van in her wedding dress and narrating, "I'm Liz Parker, and I'm happy".

Home media

Soundtrack 
A soundtrack of the series was released on February 26, 2002. The soundtrack featured Ash, Coldplay, Sarah McLachlan and others.

Although the show used many popular songs throughout its original airing, due to licensing issues many songs were replaced on the home video releases, with the new songs handpicked by the show's original music supervisors. There are notable exceptions in which songs that became important or symbolic plot moments were retained, such as the use of "Fear" by Sarah McLachlan and "Crash Into Me" by Dave Matthews Band in the pilot and "I Shall Believe" by Sheryl Crow in a later episode. Similarly, Dido's "Here with Me" was also kept as the show's opening theme music throughout all three seasons on DVD.

However, the German language track is the only audio track to contain the original music. Similarly, the syndicated episodes of the show also contain all of the original music.

Novels
In addition to the original Roswell High book series that inspired the television series, a range of novels were published based on the events depicted in the show. These focused on events that largely went unexplained on screen.

Pocket Books
While Roswell was still on air, three novels were published by Pocket Books. When the show was cancelled, this series ceased publication.

 Loose Ends by Greg Cox (June 2001)
 No Good Deed by D.A. Stern (October 2001)
 Little Green Men by D.W. Smith and K.K. Rusch (April 2002)

Simon Spotlight Entertainment
In 2002, Simon Spotlight Entertainment picked up the Roswell range and published eight more novels. Following low sales, the series ended a year later. The first four novels act as a bridge between seasons two and three, and the last four are set after the events of the series.

 Shades by Mel Odom (September 2002)
 Skeletons In The Closet by Andy Mangels & Michael A. Martin (November 2002)
 Dreamwalk by Paul Ruditis (January 2003)
 Quarantine by Laura Burns (March 2003)
 A New Beginning by Kevin Ryan (June 2003)
 Nightscape by Kevin Ryan (July 2003)
 Pursuit by Andy Mangels & Michael A. Martin (September 2003)
 Turnabout by Andy Mangels & Michael A. Martin (November 2003)

Re-imagining

On October 12, 2017, The CW announced that a re-imagining of the book series was in development. Unlike the original series, the new series has an immigration twist, focusing on the young daughter of undocumented immigrants who returns to her hometown of Roswell to shockingly discover that her teenage crush, now a police officer, is an extraterrestrial. On January 30, 2018, The CW issued a pilot order for the new version. On February 15, 2018, it was announced that Julie Plec would direct the pilot.

Production companies involved with the pilot include Amblin Television, Bender Brown Productions, CBS Television Studios and Warner Bros. Television (previously produced from Regency Television and 20th Century Fox Television).

On February 16, 2018, Jeanine Mason was cast in the lead role. Weeks later, it was announced that Nathan Parsons, Michael Trevino, Heather Hemmens, Michael Vlamis, Lily Cowles and Tyler Blackburn were added to the cast.

On May 11, 2018, it was announced that The CW ordered Roswell, New Mexico to series and would premiere on January 15, 2019. It is set to conclude its run after four seasons in the latter half of 2022.

References

External links

 
 
 official site (Sci Fi Channel). Archived from the original on April 17, 2004

 
1990s American teen drama television series
1999 American television series debuts
2000s American teen drama television series
2002 American television series endings
1990s American science fiction television series
2000s American science fiction television series
Television series about teenagers
Television series by 20th Century Fox Television
Television shows set in New Mexico
Serial drama television series
Television shows based on American novels
UPN original programming
The WB original programming
English-language television shows